Jeffrey Adam " Duff" Goldman is a pastry chef,  television personality, and cookbook author. He is the executive chef of the Baltimore-based Charm City Cakes shop, which was featured in the Food Network reality television show Ace of Cakes, and his second, Los Angeles-based, shop Charm City Cakes West, which is featured in Food Network's Duff Till Dawn and "Cake Masters" series. His work has also been featured on the Food Network Challenge, Iron Chef America, Oprah, The Tonight Show with Jay Leno, Man v. Food, Buddy vs. Duff, Duff Takes the Cake, and Duff's Happy Fun Bake Time.

Early life
Goldman was born in Detroit, Michigan, to a Jewish family. He moved shortly after to Missouri. Goldman's nickname Duff came about when he was a baby. His toddler brother, Willie Goldman, was unable to pronounce Jeffrey and kept saying Duffy. When he was four, his mother caught him in her kitchen wielding a meat cleaver and watching food personality Chef Tell.

After the divorce of his parents when he was ten, Goldman spent time living in both Northern Virginia and in the town of Sandwich, Massachusetts  on Cape Cod, Massachusetts. In 1992, Goldman attended McLean High School in McLean, Virginia where he played on the Highlanders ice hockey team. In 1993, he graduated from Sandwich High School in Sandwich.

From the age of fourteen, he began to work in kitchens; his first job was at a bagel store at a mall. Goldman also worked as a fry cook at McDonald's. Goldman has said that when he was a sophomore in college, he went to what he considered the finest restaurant in Baltimore, Charleston, and was inspired to apply as a cook there. The head chef, Cindy Wolf, looked at his résumé and noted that it consisted of irrelevant experience. However, Cindy did offer him a job to make cornbread and biscuits only, and this is what Goldman cites as the turning point in his career.

Shortly after college at the University of Maryland, Baltimore County, he attended schools such as Corcoran College of Art and the Culinary Institute of America at Greystone in Napa Valley, California. After working under acclaimed chefs in California, including a stagiaire position at the French Laundry and as executive pastry chef of the Vail Cascade Hotel in Colorado, he returned to Washington, D.C., to work at Todd English's Olives restaurant baking bread.

Charm City Cakes

In 2002, Goldman opened his own business called Charm City Cakes. Initially, his cake sales began as he worked out of his house in Charles Village in Baltimore, Maryland with the help of two assistants he employed. As demand grew, he hired more employees, hiring painters, architects, and sculptors to work in the bakery. Charm City Cakes frequently uses blow torches, as well as power tools such as grinders and drills to help create the underlying supports of cakes.

Goldman has made cakes for president Barack Obama's second inaugural ball in 2013, Tom Clancy, the cast of Lost, the 30 Rock cast (along with a cake prop), Sir Roger Moore, and for Katy Perry's "Birthday" video.

Cookbooks 
Goldman has written three cookbooks: Ace of Cakes: Inside the World of Charm City Cakes, Duff Bakes: Think and Bake Like a Pro at Home, and Super Good Baking for Kids.

Other televised appearances
In 2022, Goldman competed in season seven of The Masked Singer as "McTerrier" of Team Good. After the performance of Loverboy's "Working for the Weekend", McTerrier's mask accidentally came off and he had to shield his head while the panelists shielded their eyes until a crew member had to run out and put the mask back on. He was the first to be eliminated.

Goldman is a judge on several Food Network cooking competitions, such as Holiday Baking Championship, Spring Baking Championship and Kids Baking Championship. He co-hosts the last show with Valerie Bertinelli.

Personal life
As of 2021, Goldman lives in Los Angeles, California. He played bass guitar in an indie-rock band called "...soihadto...". He later became the bass player in the band Foigrock (a play on foie gras and rock and roll). He states his alternate dream job would be to perform as a bass player with the band Clutch. Goldman has made a wedding cake for Clutch's lead singer, Neil Fallon. In addition, Fallon's younger sister and Goldman's friend from college, Mary Alice Fallon-Yeskey, works at Charm City Cakes as the office manager.

Goldman is Jewish. He is involved in Tzedakah. In an interview with Hillel: The Foundation for Jewish Campus Life, Goldman said "Tzedakah is very important to me. I’ve been so fortunate with everything that has happened to me, it would be a crime not to give back."

In 2012, Goldman lost toes in a motorcycle accident.

On April 2, 2018, Goldman proposed to Johnna Colbry, whom he later married. On September 25, 2019, Goldman spoke at Cornell University, discussing the importance of Jewish identity and tzedakah in his life. On August 8, 2020, the couple announced they were expecting their first child, expected in January 2021. In January 2021, their daughter Josephine Frances Goldman was born.

Filmography 
Cake Masters (2016-)
Duff Till Dawn (2015)
Ace of Cakes (2006-2011)
Holiday Baking Championship (2014-)
Iron Chef America (2005)
Kids Baking Championship (2014-)
Spring Baking Championship (2015-)
Worst Bakers in America (2016-)
Dessert Games (2017-)
Buddy vs. Duff (2019-)
Duff Takes the Cake (2019-)
 Double Dare, 2019
 Ryan's Mystery Playdate (2019)
 Unfiltered (2020)
 Duff's Happy Fun Bake Time (2021)
 The Masked Singer (2022)

References 

Chefs from Maryland
American male chefs
American television chefs
University of Maryland, Baltimore County alumni
1974 births
Living people
Food Network chefs
American bakers
Pastry chefs
George Washington University Corcoran School alumni
Culinary Institute of America alumni
21st-century American bass guitarists
Jewish American chefs